is a manga series by Osamu Tezuka published in Kodansha's Shōnen Club from June 1954 to December 1956.

Plot 
The manga follows Kenichi, the chief detective of the national Boy Detectives' Street Society. He is joined by Donguri, a talking bird. Together, they travel to various exotic locations solving mysteries, revealing tricks and settling cases.

Incident of the House of Spiders
Kenichi's final case ("Incident of the House of Spiders") was published in Akita Publishing's Boken-O magazine.

Characters 

Detective Kenichi
The protagonist and chief of the Boy Detectives' Street Society. Every chapter has him solving a new mystery in various locations across the world.

Donguri
A Myna bird that is always at Kenichi's side. He has a special ability to be able to reproduce the voice of a person it has heard only once before.

Kenichi's Mother

Kenichi's Father

Mouse Boy

Mr. Hiranuma

Lemonade Citron

Detective Beringen

Elise

External links 
Chief Detective Kenichi in the Tezuka World database

1954 manga
Osamu Tezuka manga
Shōnen manga